Clemons is a hamlet in Washington County, New York, United States. Clemons has a post office with ZIP code 12819, which opened on April 10, 1873.

References

Hamlets in Washington County, New York
Hamlets in New York (state)